Yên Đức is a rural commune and village of Đông Triều town in Quảng Ninh Province, Vietnam.

The village is about 60 km to the west of Hạ Long Bay on the way from and to Hanoi. Yen Duc Village is a typical Vietnamese agricultural village in terms of culture and traditions. The village is surrounded by mountains which are mirrored in the Kinh Thầy River. Also, similar to other typical traditional Vietnamese villages in the North of Vietnam, Yen Duc Village has golden rice fields in the harvest time, many lakes and ponds and colorful gardens, especially the ranges of areca trees in the sunshine.

Yen Duc has many historical monuments and an ancient pagoda named Canh Huong which contains cultural and historical values dated back to Ly and Tran dynasty. In the village, all the alley roads have stone walls. The community-based tourism project has been developed in Yen Duc village since 2011. Visitors can visit Yen Duc village to see water puppet show.

References

http://english.vietnamnet.vn/fms/travel/97177/tours-of-villages-attract-foreign-tourists.html

Communes of Quảng Ninh province
Populated places in Quảng Ninh province